In mathematics, the Lefschetz zeta-function is a tool used in topological periodic and fixed point theory, and dynamical systems. Given a continuous map , the zeta-function is defined as the formal series

Examples
The identity map on  has Lefschetz zeta function

For a less trivial example, let  be the unit circle, and let  be reflection in the x-axis, that is, . Then  has Lefschetz number 2, while  is the identity map, which has Lefschetz number 0. Likewise, all odd iterates have Lefschetz number 2, while all even iterates have Lefschetz number 0.

Formula 
If f is a continuous map on a compact manifold X of dimension n (or more generally any compact polyhedron), the zeta function is given by the formula

Thus it is a rational function. The polynomials occurring in the numerator and denominator are essentially the characteristic polynomials of the map induced by f on the various homology spaces.

Connections 
This generating function is essentially an algebraic form of the Artin–Mazur zeta function, which gives geometric information about the fixed and periodic points of f.

See also

Lefschetz fixed-point theorem
Artin–Mazur zeta function
Ruelle zeta function

References

Zeta and L-functions
Dynamical systems
Fixed points (mathematics)